The Medical Record: A Weekly Journal of Medicine and Surgery was founded in 1866 by George Frederick Shrady, Sr. who was its first editor-in-chief.  Thomas Lathrop Stedman became assistant editor in 1890 and editor-in-chief in 1897.

It was published in New York City.  It was later published by the Washington Institute of Medicine.

Many issues of Medical Record are now in the public domain and available through the Google Books project.

References 

Publications established in 1866
General medical journals
1866 establishments in New York (state)